The Lingsberg Runestones are two 11th-century runestones, listed as U 240 and U 241 in the Rundata catalog, and one fragment, U 242, that are engraved in Old Norse using the younger futhark.

The two intact runestones were raised by members of the same family, and on U 241 they engraved for posterity that a grandfather had taken two Danegelds in England. Because the receipt of the Danegeld (tax) indicates likely service with the Scandinavian troops in the Thingmen from 1018 to 1066, the runestones are dated to the second quarter of the 11th century.

U 240

The U 240  runestone is known locally as the Lingsbergsstenen 1 and was raised at the end of a causeway facing U 241. The causeway is only seen as traces in a field, and U 240 is the only runestone present. The area was much more marshy in the past and difficult to traverse until the water level in a local lake, Angarn, in Angarnsjöängen Nature Reserve was lowered in the 19th century. The inscription consists of runic text on two serpents or lindworms that bracket a Christian cross and some beasts. The final portion of the text that translates as "and Holmfríðr in memory of her husbandman" is carved on the outside of the serpent to the right. U 240 is classified as being carved in runestone style Pr3, which is also known as Urnes style, and is considered to be a good example of an inscription in style Pr3. This runestone style is characterized by slim and stylized animals that are interwoven into tight patterns. The animal heads are typically seen in profile with slender almond-shaped eyes and upwardly curled appendages on the noses and the necks. The runic text on U 240 was intended to be read together with that on U 241 to form a unified message. Based on stylistic analysis, the inscription has been attributed to the runemaster Åsmund, who was active in the first part of the 11th century.

Latin transliteration:

 tan auk hus(k)arl + auk suain + auk hulmfriþr × þaun (m)(i)(þ)kin litu rita stin þino × aftiʀ halftan + fa(þ)ur þaiʀa tans ' auk hum(f)riþr at buanta sin

Old Norse transcription:

 Dan ok Huskarl ok Svæinn ok Holmfriðr, þaun møðgin letu retta stæin þenna æftiʀ Halfdan, faður þæiʀa Dans, ok Holmfriðr at boanda sinn.

English translation:

 Danr and Húskarl and Sveinn and Holmfríðr, the mother and (her) sons, had this stone erected in memory of Halfdan, the father of Danr and his brothers; and Holmfríðr in memory of her husbandman.

U 241

The U 241 runestone, known locally as the Lingsbergsstenen 2, was originally at the end of a causeway facing U 240. It was discovered in 1909 when plowing a field. It has been moved and is in the courtyard of the main building of Lingsberg. The inscription consists of runic text carved on an intertwined serpent that is under a cross. Similar to U 240, U 241 is classified as being carved in runestone style Pr3 and is attributed to the runemaster Åsmund.

The runic text mentions Húskarl and Sveinn like U 241, except for Holmfríðr, and it adds Halfdan's father Ulfríkr, who had taken two danegelds in England. It does not mention which leaders paid the danegelds, unlike the other two runestones in Uppland that talk of danegelds, U 344 and U 194. The runic texts of U 240 and U 241 were intended to be read together to form a unified message, with the text on U 241 beginning with the Old Norse word en meaning "and."

It was common to only carve a single rune for two consecutive letters, even when the letters were at the end of one word and the beginning of a second word. When the text shown as Latin characters, the transliterated runes are doubled and separate words are shown. U 241 has three examples in its runic text where this occurred. The runes onklanti are transliterated as o| |onklanti, kialtakit as kialt| |takit, and salukuþs as salu| |uk| |kuþs. The Norse word salu for soul in the prayer at the end of the inscription was imported from English and was first recorded during the tenth century.

Latin transliteration:

 n tan auk huskarl ' auk sua(i)n ' l(i)tu rita stin aftiʀ ' ulfrik ' faþurfaþur sino ' hon hafþi o| |onklanti tuh kialt| |takit + kuþ hialbi þiʀa kiþka salu| |uk| |kuþs muþ(i)

Old Norse transcription:

 En Dan ok Huskarl ok Svæinn letu retta stæin æftiʀ Ulfrik, faðurfaður sinn. Hann hafði a Ænglandi tu giald takit. Guð hialpi þæiʀa fæðga salu ok Guðs moðiʀ.

English translation:

 And Danr and Húskarl and Sveinn had the stone erected in memory of Ulfríkr, their father's father. He had taken two payments in England. May God and God's mother help the souls of the father and son.

U 242

The U 242 runestone has been found as only a fragment. It is lying beside U 241 at the drive of the main building of Lingsberg.

Latin transliteration:

 - × auk × st[u]... ... ...- × (r)(a)(i)(s)(a) × ...

Old Norse transcription:

 ... ok ... ... ... ræisa ...

English translation:

 ... and ... ... ... raise ...

See also
List of runestones

References

Sources
Sveriges runinskrifter (1922) by Erik Brate
Christer Hamp's page on runestones.

External links
 An English Dictionary of Runic Inscriptions of the Younger Futhark, at the university of Nottingham

Runestones in Uppland
Runestones in memory of Viking warriors